The 2008 New York Democratic presidential primary took place on February 5, 2008, also known as Super Tuesday. Polls indicated that New York Senator Hillary Clinton was leading rival Senator Barack Obama by double digits in the weeks before the contest, and she ended up winning with roughly 57% of the vote.

Polls

Polls throughout the campaign indicated that Hillary Clinton, a Senator from New York, was clearly favored to win the New York primary. She won every poll conducted in the state by double digits except one, and got more than 40% in every poll conducted, even with various challengers. After the number of candidates dropped significantly in late January, Clinton won 50% or more in every poll but one.

Vote discrepancies

After the votes were initially counted on election night, certain districts near New York City were found to be missing their vote tallies for Obama.  The New York Times conducted a review of the unofficial results from the primary. They found that, among New York City's 6,106 election districts participating, 80 districts did not record a single vote for Obama, including heavily black districts like Harlem, as well as districts next to others where Obama had very favorable results. City election officials reviewed the vote tallies and found several inaccuracies. For example, in Harlem where Clinton led Obama 141 to 0, the recounted vote was counted as 261 to 136, Clinton. In Brooklyn the primary night vote was 118 to 0, Clinton, whereas the recounted vote went 118 to 116, Clinton.

Democratic leaders blamed the discrepancies on "human error" due to weary election officials on primary day. According to ABC News, however, other candidates such as John Edwards did not have this problem; it seemed to be almost exclusive to Obama.

The counting errors only occurred in the election night tallies, which are always unofficial.  Following normal procedures, the votes were re-tallied before being officially certified.  The final, official results left Clinton with 139 pledged delegates to the 2008 Democratic National Convention and Obama with 93.

Results

Results by county

See also
 2008 Democratic Party presidential primaries
 2008 New York Republican presidential primary

References 

New York
2008
2008 New York (state) elections
2008 Super Tuesday